Lemerle's dwarf hippopotamus (Hippopotamus lemerlei) is an extinct species of Malagasy hippopotamus.

Taxonomy
Malagasy hippopotamuses were first discovered in the mid-19th century by Alfred Grandidier, who unearthed nearly 50 individual hippos from a dried-up swamp at Ambolisaka near Lake Ihotry, a few miles from the Mozambique Channel. In 1989, Scandinavian palaeontologist Solweig Stuenes described H. madagascariensis and H. lemerlei from these bones.

It may have descended from full-sized hippos who shrunk due to insular dwarfism, similar to many Mediterranean island hippos, such as with the Cretan dwarf hippopotamus or the Cyprus dwarf hippopotamus.

Description
Hippopotamus lemerlei bones have been mostly discovered in the rivers and lakes (riparian environments) of western Madagascar, suggesting a habitat very similar to that of the modern hippo of modern Africa. H. lemerlei also shared the high-placed eyes that make it easier to see while submerged.

Although a clear relative to the common hippopotamus, H. lemerlei was much smaller, roughly the size of the modern pygmy hippopotamus (Choeropsis liberiensis).

Bones of H. lemerlei have been dated to about 1,000 years ago (980±200 radiocarbon years before present.

Paleoecology

Diet
Hippopotamus lemerlei and contemporary Aldabrachelys tortoises were the dominant grazers in Madagascar. Malagasy hippos in general, however, were less grass-specialised than the mainland African hippo.

Extinction
Although there have been no remains dating to within the last thousand years, the hippopotamus has been surprisingly common in Malagasy oral legends. The strength of these oral traditions led the International Union for Conservation of Nature (IUCN) to classify H. lemerlei as recently extinct (going extinct some time after the year 1500).

At least seven hippopotamus bones show unequivocal signs of butchery, suggesting that they survived until humans arrived on Madagascar, perhaps coexisting with humans for about 2,000 years. It is also possible that over-hunting by humans led to their extinction.

See also
Hippopotamus madagascariensis
Hippopotamus laloumena

References

Extinct hippopotamuses
Holocene extinctions
Extinct animals of Madagascar
Mammal extinctions since 1500
Mammals described in 1989